Matilde Zimmermann (born September 6, 1943) is an American author and professor who ran as the Socialist Workers Party candidate for United States Vice President in 1980. The party had three different presidential candidates that year, Andrew Pulley, Richard H. Congress and Clifton DeBerry depending on the state. She was at the time a writer for the party newspaper The Militant. Zimmermann also ran as an alternate vice presidential candidate for Andrea Gonzales in some states in 1984; Melvin T. Mason was the presidential candidate.

Zimmermann (PhD History 1998) is the Residente Director of SLC (Sarah Lawrence College) in Cuba and is a faculty member in History and Global Studies at SLC. She has been based in Havana the last two fall semesters (2003 and 2004) as director of SLC in Cuba. Because of the U.S. restrictions on undergraduate academic programs in Cuba, Sarah Lawrence is now the only program of U.S. students at the University of Havana. She once said that the argument that Cubans were living under a dictatorship was an "American propaganda".

Bibliography
 Sandinista: Carlos Fonseca and the Nicaraguan Revolution (Duke, 2001) 
 Carlos Fonseca y la revolución nicaragüense (Managua, 2003)
 Bajo las banderas del Che y de Sandino (Havana, 2004)
 A Revolução Nicaragüense (São Paulo, 2005) 
 Comandante Carlos: La vida de Carlos Fonseca Amador (Caracas, 2008)

References

1943 births
Living people
American women writers
Sarah Lawrence College faculty
Socialist Workers Party (United States) vice presidential nominees
1984 United States vice-presidential candidates
20th-century American politicians
Female candidates for Vice President of the United States
Socialist Workers Party (United States) politicians from New York (state)
20th-century American women politicians
American women academics